Puritan is a former unincorporated community in Weld County, Colorado United States.

The community took its name from the nearby Puritan Coal Mine, so named for the high quality of its coal.

History
In 1908, the Union Pacific Railroad laid a spur line to service the Puritan Gold Mine located there.  A "company town" operated by the National Fuel Company was erected around the mine, and all the houses and stores were owned by the company and rented to miners and their families.  Puritan had a store, boarding house, pool hall, and 100 houses.

Most of the houses were sold and moved.

References

Unincorporated communities in Weld County, Colorado
Unincorporated communities in Colorado